Colón may refer to:

Places
Argentina
 Colón, Entre Ríos
 Colón Department, Córdoba
 Colón Department, Entre Ríos
 Colón, Buenos Aires

Colombia
 Colón, Nariño
 Colón, Putumayo
 Colón Department (Colombia)

Costa Rica
 Ciudad Colón

Cuba
 Colón, Cuba

El Salvador
 Colón, La Libertad

Honduras
 Colón Department (Honduras)

Mexico
 Colón, Querétaro

Panama
 Colón, Panama
 Colón Province

Puerto Rico
 Plaza Colón, in Mayagüez

Spain
 Plaza de Colón (Madrid)
 Colón (Metrovalencia), station in Valencia

Uruguay
 Colón Centro y Noroeste, barrio of Montevideo
 Colón Sudeste, barrio of Montevideo
 Colón, Uruguay, village in Lavalleja Department

Venezuela
 Colón, Venezuela
 Colón Municipality, Zulia in Zulia State

Football teams
 Club Atlético Colón, from Santa Fe, Argentina

 Colón Fútbol Club, a Uruguayan club

Other uses
 Colón (surname)
 Colón (currency)
 Costa Rican colón, currency of Costa Rica
 Salvadoran colón, former currency of El Salvador
 Preludio a Colón, a musical composition by Julián Carrillo
 Teatro Colón, Buenos Aires, Argentina

See also
 The Colóns (disambiguation)
 Colon (disambiguation)
 Cologne (disambiguation)